The country of Syria is administratively subdivided into 14 governorates, which are sub-divided into 65 districts, which are further divided into 284 sub-districts. Each of the governorates and districts has its own centre or capital city, except for Rif Dimashq Governorate and Markaz Rif Dimashq district. All the sub-districts have their own centres as well.

Each district bears the same name as its administrative centre, with the exception of Mount Simeon District where the centre is the city of Aleppo. The same applies to all nahiyas (sub-districts), except for the Mount Simeon Nahiyah where the centre is the city of Aleppo.

Governorate and district capital cities

Sixty-four of the 65 districts of Syria have a city that serves as the regional capital (administrative centre); Markaz Rif Dimashq is a district with no official regional centre.

The city of Damascus functions as a governorate, a district and a subdistrict. The Rif Dimashq Governorate has no official centre and its headquarters are in Damascus.

The first 13 cities in the list are the centre of their governorate, as well as of their district.

The population figures are from the 2004 official census.

Other cities

See also 
Cities and towns during the Syrian civil war
Districts of Syria
Governorates of Syria
List of towns and villages in Syria

References 

Syria, List of cities in
 
Cities